Great Fransham is a village and former civil parish in the Breckland district, in the county of Norfolk, England, roughly about an equal distance between Swaffham and Dereham. There is also a Little Fransham; the two villages, both now part of the parish of Fransham, were once served by Fransham railway station. In 1931 the parish had a population of 222. On 1 April 1935 the parish was abolished and merged to form Fransham.

The villages name origin is uncertain either, 'homestead/village' or 'hemmed-in land' with an unknown personal name.

Places

All Saints Church

The church of All Saints is flint in the Early English style, consisting of chancel, nave, north porch and a square tower with spire; it contains two ancient brasses: it was restored in 1878 at a cost of about £700 and is a Grade II* listed building. The register dates from the year 1558. The living is a rectory, yearly value £552, with residence and 62 acres of glebe, in the gift of Magdalene College, Cambridge, and held since 1853 by the Rev. Vincent Raven M.A. late fellow, tutor, and president of that college.

Alongside is a schoolhouse, built in 1871. Kelly's directory Cambridgeshire, Norfolk & Suffolk, in 1883 claims "The school is for 80 children, average attendance 51, supported by voluntary rate & school pence; Miss Esther Quartermain, mistress".

Gt. Fransham Mill

Gt. Fransham towermill was a four-storey mill that stood at Mill Farm described as a very wide-towered Mill, not very high, but thick & heavily built. The mill used four patent sails to power two pairs of French burr stones. A pulley wheel was set onto the outside of the mill to allow auxiliary power via a belt from a steam engine. In 1886, two windmills were advertised to be let, along with a bake office on the same site.
The Mill had a history of tragedy. The Norfolk News of 10 February 1866 reported 
On Thursday in last week a distressing accident accompanied by a fatal termination occurred in Mr. Perkins’ mill, the unfortunate victim being a respectable & steady married man in his service, named Crispin Howard. About ten minutes before eleven in the forenoon Mr. Perkins left the deceased following his usual avocation. On his return shortly after eleven, Mr. Perkins thought the mill was not working so smoothly as before he left & on looking upwards he discovered the lifeless body of his workman resting on the beam to which he had been elevated after having been drawn in & passed between the two cog wheels. From the nature of the wounds inflicted, it was obvious death must have been instantaneous. The dead man who was fifty five years of age leaves a widow & three children to mourn his loss & for whom much sympathy is felt. At the inquest held on Saturday, the only verdict that could be found in the circumstances was returned – that of "Accidental death".
Just a few years later The King's Lynn Advertiser reported in April 1874 that Jonathan Perkins, miller of Gt Fransham was fatally injured on being thrown out of a pony cart when it hit a gatepost.
By the early part of the 20th century, the end had come for Great Fransham Mill.
The Dereham & Fakenham Times - 28 August 1909 reported the sale of the mill by auction at the 
George Hotel, East Dereham, on 23 August 1909.
Mr. Heyhoe next offered the substantial built brick tower windmill situate at the Mill Farm, Great Fransham. This contained patent sails, two pairs of stones, shafting gear and fittings in good order and were sold subject to being removed from the occupation by 11 October next, from instructions from the trustees of Court 1246 A. O. F. (Swaffham). Mr. Crane was the purchaser for £7. This was the Crane family who owned the wagon works at Gt Fransham.

The brick tower has been long demolished however Mill Farm House, which dates from the second half of the 16th century, still exists.

Railway

The Lynn & Dereham Railway was given the Royal Assent on 21 July 1845, opened in stages between 1846 and 1848, and later became part of the Great Eastern Railway. Hunt's Directory of East Norfolk 1850 shows Edgar Skeit as a 'railway clerk'. However White's History, Gazetteer, and Directory, of Norfolk 1854 lists Edgar Skeet as being station master at Great Fransham. He would spend over 30 years in this role.

He was christened on 20 August 1804 at Ubbeston, Suffolk.
William White's History, Gazetteer, and Directory of Norfolk 1883
lists him as still being stationmaster despite being 80 years old.

He died in September 1888 aged 84 and is buried in the North East corner of Beeston churchyard.

In the early days, four passenger trains and one goods train would pass through the station each way daily, giving ten movements. Great Fransham was a halt between the two major junctions of East Dereham and Swaffham. The station also had a level crossing.

The original intention of the company had been to extend their line to Great Yarmouth, via Norwich, but this plan was blocked by the rival Wymondham to Dereham scheme proposed by the Norfolk Railway

The line was closed to passenger and freight services by the Eastern Region of British Railways on Saturday, 7 September 1968.

People

William Crane

In 1865, at the age of 24, William Crane set up a blacksmith's shop in the village of Great Fransham in Norfolk. Little could have William known that the name of Crane would go on to become one of the biggest names in transport in the 20th century.
William and his three brothers all followed in their father by becoming apprenticed Blacksmiths. William went on to develop a new type of horse rake, cart wheels and farm Wagons. Later with his two sons, the business expanded further and was registered in the 1883 White's directory as "William Crane - Agricultural implement maker, joiner and builder, smith and wheel wright and church bell hanger". Due to a bad debt, they received a load of timber which provided the raw material for the production of various carts and wagons.

William died in 1906 and his two sons carried on the business, which continued to expand and in 1913 Cranes acquired the former Mallons agricultural works at South green in Dereham. Cranes by this time had such an excellent reputation for its products that it secured a substantial order for gun carriage wheels and field ambulances for the army. In 1920, Edward Crane returned to the Fransham workshop to continue his timber business and the Dereham facility branched out into road trailers. Cranes had an excellent reputation for specialist trailers and secured some significant military contracts on the back of their expertise and quality of build.

Crane's began making trucks using designs by the American-based Fruehauf Trailer Corporation in the early 1960s, with the North Walsham factory opening in 1962 and Toftwood (Dereham) in 1968. The Crane name then became intrinsically linked with Fruehauf and the Crane Fruehauf brand became synonymous with the trailer units plying their trade all over Europe, following the growth of roll-on - roll-off routes to the continent.
Taken over by General Trailers in 1997, the company later reinstated under the Fruehauf brand.
When the Crane Fruehauf factory in Dereham collapsed in 2005, laying off its remaining 345 workers, an important chapter in Norfolk's industrial history came to an abrupt end.

Sir Vincent Raven

Vincent Litchfield Raven was born on 3 December 1858 the son of a clergyman at Great Fransham Rectory, Norfolk and educated at Aldenham School in Hertfordshire. In 1876 he began his career with the North Eastern Railway as a pupil of the then Locomotive Superintendent, Edward Fletcher. By 1893 he had achieved the post of Assistant Mechanical Engineer to Wilson Worsdell who was then the Locomotive Superintendent. In this post he was involved for the first time with an electrification project, as the N.E.R. was electrifying the North Tyneside suburban route in 1904. This was a third-rail system at 600 volts DC. In 1910, Raven becomes Chief Mechanical Engineer for the NER. He then starts the first phase of his new locomotives using both steam and electric propulsion. By 1912 Raven has begun to add superheating to many NER steam locomotives. Raven's designs continued NER traditions but he was also innovative. He oversaw the electrification of the Shildon to Newport freight line, planned further electrification, and developed a widely used cab signalling system.
During World War I, Raven was Superintendent at the Royal Arsenal, Woolwich where he organised munitions production, for which he received a knighthood in 1917.] The Grouping of the railways in 1923 gave the Chief Mechanical Engineer's post to Nigel Gresley of the Great Northern Railway and Raven became a Technical Adviser. He resigned in 1924 and was appointed to the Royal Commission on New South Wales Government Railways, in company with Sir Sam Fay and on the same trip they repeated a similar commission for New Zealand Government Railways. In 1925, he travelled to India to investigate manpower issues there. 
He died on 14 February 1934 after heart trouble whilst on holiday with Lady Raven in Felixstowe.

Church Farm

With the arrival of the railway the Rev. Vincent Raven invested in creating a model farm to provide
milk and farm produce for the rectory and to sell at Dereham and King's Lynn markets. A new slate roofed farmhouse and pantiled group of model farm buildings were constructed on glebe land near the new railway line.

References

External links

Villages in Norfolk
Former civil parishes in Norfolk
Breckland District